Astereae is a tribe of plants in the family Asteraceae that includes annuals, biennials, perennials, subshrubs, shrubs, and trees. They are found primarily in temperate regions of the world. Plants within the tribe are present nearly worldwide divided into over 250 genera and more than 3,100 species, making it the second-largest tribe in the family behind Senecioneae.

The taxonomy of the tribe Astereae has been dramatically changed after both morphologic and molecular evidence suggested that large genera such as Aster, as well as many others, needed to be separated into several genera or shifted to better reflect the plants' relationships. A paper by R. D. Noyes and L. H. Rieseberg showed that most of the genera within the tribe in North America actually belong to a single clade, meaning they have a common ancestor. This is referred to as the North American clade.  Guy L. Nesom and Harold E. Robinson have been involved in the recent work and are continuing to re-categorise the genera within the tribe worldwide.

Subtribes
, tribe Astereae is divided into 36 accepted subtribes.

Selected genera

Acamptopappus (A.Gray) A.Gray
Achnophora F. Muell.
Almutaster Á.Löve & D.Löve
Amellus L.
Ampelaster G.L.Nesom
Amphiachyris (DC.) Nutt. – broomweed
Amphipappus Torr. & A.Gray
Aphanostephus DC. – Lazydaisy
Arida (R.L.Hartm.) D.R.Morgan – desert tansy-aster
Aster L.
Astranthium Nutt. – western-daisy
Baccharis L.
Bellis L. – daisy
Bellium L.
Benitoa D.D.Keck
Bigelowia DC. – rayless-goldenrod
Boltonia L'Hér. – doll's-daisy
Brachyscome Cass.
Bradburia Torr. & A.Gray – goldenaster
Brintonia Greene
Callistephus Cass.
Calotis R. Br.
Camptacra N.T.Burb.
Canadanthus G.L.Nesom
Celmisia
Centipeda Lour.
Ceruana Forssk.
Chaetopappa DC.
Chiliotrichum Cass.
Chloracantha G.L.Nesom
Chrysocoma L.
Chrysoma Nutt.
Chrysopsis (Nutt.) Elliott
Chrysothamnus Nutt. – rabbitbrush
Columbiadoria G.L.Nesom
Commidendrum DC.
Conyza Less.
Corethrogyne DC. – sandaster
Crinitaria Cass.
Croptilon Raf.
Cuniculotinus Urbatsch, R.P.Roberts & Neubig – rock goldenrod
Damnamenia Given
Darwiniothamnus Harling
Dichrocephala DC.
Dichaetophora A.Gray
Dieteria Nutt.
Diplostephium Kunth
Doellingeria Nees – tall flat-topped aster
Eastwoodia Brandegee
Egletes Cass – tropic daisy 
Ericameria Nutt. – goldenbush
Erigeron L. – fleabane
Eucephalus Nutt.
Eurybia (Cass.) Cass.
Euthamia (Nutt.) Cass.
Felicia Cass.
Formania  W.W.Sm. & J.Small
Galatella Cass.
Geissolepis B.L.Rob.
Grangea Adans.
Grindelia Willd. – gum-plant, resin-weed
Gundlachia A.Gray – goldenshrub
Gutierrezia Lag. 
Gymnosperma Less. – gumhead, sticky selloa
Haplopappus 
Hazardia Greene – bristleweed
Herrickia Wooton & Standl.
Heterotheca Cass.
Hysterionica Willd.
Ionactis Greene  – ankle-aster
Isocoma Nutt. – jimmyweed, goldenweed
Kalimeris (Cass.) Cass.
Kemulariella Tamamsch.
Kippistia F. Muell. – fleshy minuria
Lachnophyllum Bunge
Laennecia Cass.
Lagenophora Cass.
Lessingia Cham.
Lorandersonia Urbatsch et al. – rabbitbush 	
Machaeranthera Nees
Miyamayomena Kitam.
Monoptilon Torr. & A.Gray – desertstar
Myriactis Less.
Neonesomia Urbatsch & R.P.Roberts – goldenshrub
Nestotus Urbatsch, R.P.Roberts & Neubig  goldenweed, mock goldenweed
Nolletia Cass.
Oclemena Greene
Olearia Moench
Oligoneuron Small
Oonopsis (Nutt.) Greene
Oreochrysum (A.Gray) Rydb.
Oreostemma Greene – mountaincrown
Oritrophium (Kunth) Cuatrec.
Pachystegia (Hook. f.) Cheeseman
Pentachaeta Nutt. – pygmydaisy
Peripleura (N. T. Burb.) G.L.Nesom
Petradoria Greene – rock goldenrod
Pleurophyllum Hook.f.
Podocoma Cass.
Polyarrhena Cass.
Psiadia Jacq.
Psilactis A.Gray
Psychrogeton  Boiss.
Pteronia L.
Pyrrocoma Hook. – goldenweed
Rayjacksonia R.L.Hartm.
Remya Hillebr. ex Benth. & Hook.f.
Rhynchospermum Reinw.
Rigiopappus A.Gray – wireweed
Sericocarpus Nees – white-topped aster 
Sheareria S.Moore
Solidago L.
Stenotus Nutt. – goldenweed, mock goldenweed
Symphyotrichum Nees
Tetramolopium – Pamakani
Thurovia Rose
Toiyabea R.P.Roberts
Tonestus A.Nelson – serpentweed
Townsendia Hook.
Tracyina S.F.Blake
Triniteurybia Brou.
Tripolium Nees
Vittadinia A. Rich.
Xanthisma DC. – sleepydaisy
Xanthocephalum Willd.
Xylorhiza Nutt. – woody-aster
Xylothamia G.L.Nesom – desert goldenrod

Sources: FNA, E+M, UniProt, NHNSW, AFPD

References

External links

List of genera, Astereae Working Group

 
Asteraceae tribes